Cladia beaugleholei is a lichen in the family Cladoniaceae, found in Australia. It was first described as Heterodea beaugleholei in 1978 by Rex Filson, from a specimen collected from forest soil in New South Wales.  The species epithet honours Alexander Clifford Beauglehole. It was reassigned to the genus, Cladia by Sittiporn Parnmen and H. Thorsten Lumbsch in 2012.

Under the Nature Conservation Act 1992  of Queensland, its Queensland conservation status is of "Least Concern".

References

External links
What is a lichen?, Australian National Botanical Garden

beaugleholei
Lichen species
Lichens of Australia
Lichens described in 1978
Taxa named by Rex Bertram Filson